The Oran Community Church was built in 1851 in Pompey, New York.  The architect was John Edson Sweet and the builder was Truman Little.

Gallery

References

Churches on the National Register of Historic Places in New York (state)
Churches completed in 1851
19th-century churches in the United States
Churches in Onondaga County, New York
1851 establishments in New York (state)
National Register of Historic Places in Onondaga County, New York